This is a list of Eurosceptic political parties in Europe. This list includes both active and defunct political parties, as well as both soft and hard Eurosceptic parties.

By country

Armenia

Austria

Azerbaijan

Belarus

Belgium

Bosnia and Herzegovina

Bulgaria

Croatia

Czech Republic

Denmark

Estonia

Faroe Islands

Finland

France

Germany

Hungary

Georgia

Greece

Iceland

Ireland

Italy

Kazakhstan

Latvia

Lithuania

Luxembourg

Malta

Moldova

Montenegro

Netherlands

Norway

Poland

Portugal

Romania

Russia

Serbia

Slovakia

Slovenia

Spain

Sweden

Switzerland

Turkey

Ukraine

United Kingdom

See also
 List of pro-European political parties

References

Sources

 
 
 

 
 

Eurosceptic